Schistura callichroma is a species of ray-finned fish in the stone loch genus Schistura from Yunnan.

References 

callichroma
Fish described in 1985